Michel Corneille the Elder (c. 1601 – 1664) was a French painter, etcher, and engraver.

Life
Corneille was born in Orléans. He was one of many who studied with the celebrated master Simon Vouet, who strongly influenced French painting of the early 17th century.

In 1648, Corneille was one of the founders of the French Royal Academy of Painting and Sculpture and was elected as one of the original twelve elders in charge of its running. He became its rector in 1656.

Corneille devoted himself to historical paintings. He was an excellent colorist—in this more Venetian than French—and his early style resembled that of Simon Vouet; later his work had all the merits and all the faults of the post-Raphaelite, or decadent, "sweet", school of Italian art, showing the far-reaching influence of the Carracci. He was long employed in the decoration of churches in Paris, his masterpiece being the celebrated "St. Paul and St. Barnabas at Lystra", painted for the Cathedral of Notre-Dame. His etched and engraved work differed very little from that of the Carracci and of his two sons. It was chiefly reproductive. Notable examples are the "Murder of the Innocents", after Raphael, and the "Virgin Suckling the Infant Jesus", after Lodovico Carracci. He died in Paris in 1664.

References

Bibliography
 
 
 
 

MEYER, Geschichte der französischen Malerei (Leipzig, 1867)
 That entry was written by Leigh Hunt.

External links
Orazio and Artemisia Gentileschi, a fully digitized exhibition catalog from The Metropolitan Museum of Art Libraries, which contains material on Michel Corneille the Elder (see index)

17th-century French painters
French male painters
History painters
Painters from Paris
1600s births
1664 deaths